The Baylor Bears track and field program represents the Baylor University in the sport of track and field.  The indoor and outdoor programs compete in Division I of the National Collegiate Athletic Association (NCAA) and the Big 12 Conference (Big 12).  The Bears host their home outdoor meets at Clyde Hart Track and Field Stadium, located on the university's Waco, Texas campus.

History 
Baylor's heralded track and field team has produced nine Olympic gold medals, 36 NCAA championships, and 606 All-Americas performances.  A majority of the All-Americans coming under the 42-year tenure of head coach Clyde Hart. A marquee element of the track program has been its men's 4 × 400 relay team, which has sent teams to the NCAA finals in each of the past 28 years. Baylor track and field has also produced three Olympic gold medalists: Michael Johnson, Jeremy Wariner and Darold Williamson. Baylor grads won gold in the 400 meter dash at three consecutive Olympics (Johnson in '96 and '00, then Wariner in '04). In 2005, Clyde Hart became Director of Track & Field, and Todd Harbour took over as head coach of Baylor's track and field and cross country squads.

Coaching staff 

Michael Ford - Head Coach

Baylor Olympic track and field medalists

Men

References 

Track And Field